Season 14 of the American competitive reality television series Hell's Kitchen premiered on March 3, 2015 on Fox. The prize is a head chef position at Gordon Ramsay Pub & Grill in Caesars Atlantic City. Gordon Ramsay returned as head chef with Andi Van Willigan and James Avery returning as sous-chefs for both their respective kitchens as well as Marino Monferrato as the maître d'. Executive Chef Meghan Gill from Roanoke, Virginia, won the competition, thus becoming the fourteenth winner of Hell's Kitchen.

This season's head to head finals happened between the third pair of the top two finalists that did not receive any nominations for elimination.

This season, the Blue Team set a new record for the most dinner service wins by a team in a single season (discounting season finales and joint victories) with six. It surpassed the previous record of five set by the Blue Team in Seasons 6 and 7 and the Red Team in Season 10. The season also had only one joint dinner service loss between the red and blue teams, the fewest such occurrences since season four. This red team also tied a record set by the blue team from Season 10, having been kicked out of the kitchen five times throughout the season. Gill became the eighth winner of the series to avoid nomination throughout the entire season. Gill also set a Hell's Kitchen record with nine consecutive punishments until she finally won the last challenge of the season, a distinction previously shared by Season 4 runner-up Louis Petrozza, Season 12 third place finisher Melanie Finch, and lastly, Season 13 third place finisher Sade Dancy, who had seven each. 

Despite the blue team, which started with all men, setting a new record for the most dinner service wins by a team in a single season, this was the third season to feature two women in the finale (following seasons two and eleven), the first season to have all women in the top three, and the third season that neither the winner nor runner-up was nominated once for elimination, after seasons six and seven. Sixth-place chef Josh Trovato ties with Season 12's Michael DeMarco (discounting the "Cook For Your Life" challenge in Episode 9) for the longest consecutive streak of nominations. In further extension, this is the first season since Season 7 that did not have any episodes ending in cliffhanger before elimination, and final season to feature tradition double elimination before finals, until reoccurring in season 18.

Both teams each had separate, unusual distinctions during the signature dish challenge. The Blue team became the first team in Hell's Kitchen history to receive approval for every dish from Ramsay as all the men received a score of 3 or 4. So far, they are the only Blue Team in the history of the show to have this distinction. The Red team's signature dishes eventually became a near perfect predictor for the order of elimination. The three members who received 1 (Chrissa, Mieka and Monique) were the first three women to be eliminated and the two chefs receiving 5 (T and Meghan) were the two finalists. The only anomaly was Alison (who scored the Red team's lone 3) surviving longer than two of her teammates who scored 4 (Sarah and Christine).

This season also set a record for most participants invited to participate in Hell's Kitchen a second time (six), with four in Season 17 and two on Season 18.

Chefs
Eighteen chefs competed for the head chef position in season 14.

Notes

Contestant progress

Episodes

Ratings

U.S. Nielsen ratings

The fourteenth-season premiere of Hell's Kitchen premiered to an audience of 4.09 million, 0.18 million lower than last season's premiere, but up 0.49 million from season 13's finale.

References

Hell's Kitchen (American TV series)
2015 American television seasons